The following is a timeline of the history of the city of Las Vegas, Nevada, United States.
The Spanish Trader Antonio Armijo led a 60-man party along the Spanish Trail to Los Angeles, California in 1829 and found a natural steam water Land that was named Las Vegas.

20th century

1900s–1950s

 1900 
 The population of Las Vegas, six years before it is founded as a city, is 22.
 1905 
 Las Vegas is founded as a city on May 15 when 110 acres (45 ha) of land adjacent to the San Pedro, Los Angeles and Salt Lake Railroad tracks are auctioned off by the railroad company. The areas that were auctioned off were situated between Stewart Avenue on the north, Garces Avenue to the south, Main Street to the west, and 5th Street (Las Vegas Boulevard) to the east and would later become the downtown area.
 1905 
 San Pedro, Los Angeles and Salt Lake Railroad begins operating, linking Southern California with Salt Lake City and making Las Vegas an ideal refueling point and rest stop due to the availability of water.
 1906 
 Las Vegas & Tonopah Railroad built.
 1909
 Las Vegas becomes seat of Clark County.
 Clark County Review newspaper begins publication.
 Las Vegas Evening Review and Journal newspaper in publication.
 1910
 Victory Hotel in business.
 1911
 June 1: Citizens of Las Vegas vote 168 to 57 in favor of incorporation.
 June 1: Peter Buol is elected first mayor of Las Vegas, Stewart, VonTobel, McGovern and Gaughlin become city commissioner and assure a "conservative city government".

 1920 
 Population: 2,304.
 1930 
 Population: 5,165.
 1931
 Gambling legalized.
 Hoover Dam construction begins near Las Vegas.
 1933 
 Post Office built.
 1934 
 Helldorado festival begins.

 1940
 Population: 8,422.
 Las Vegas Union Pacific Station built.
 1941 
 Las Vegas Army Airfield activated.
 1943 
 Las Vegas YMCA active.

 1944 
 Huntridge Theater built.
 1946 
 Flamingo Hotel and Golden Nugget casino in business.
 1949
 The Desert Sea News Bureau is established to promote the city, and is later renamed the Las Vegas News Bureau.
 1950
 Population: 24,624.
 U.S. military Nellis Air Force Base dedicated.
 Las Vegas Morning Sun newspaper begins publication.
 Desert Inn casino in business.

 1951 
 Binion's Horseshoe casino in business.
 1952
 Unitarian Universalist Congregation founded.
 Sahara Hotel and Casino in business.
 Sands Hotel and Casino in business.
 1953 
 City of Henderson chartered in vicinity of Las Vegas.
 KLAS-TV, Las Vegas' first television station, signs on the air.
 1955 
 Riviera Hotel and Casino in business.
 Las Vegas' second television station, KLRJ-TV (now KSNV), signs on from Henderson; it will move to Las Vegas by the end of the year.
 1956
 The City of Las Vegas annexes one square mile of land, the first such addition of land since incorporation 45 years earlier.
 Las Vegas Air Force Station in use.
 Fremont Hotel in business.
 KSHO-TV (now KTNV-TV) signs on.
 1957
 University of Nevada, Las Vegas and United Way of Southern Nevada established.
 Tropicana in business on the Strip.
 1958
 Legal Aid Center of Southern Nevada established.
 1959
 The Welcome to Fabulous Las Vegas sign is built, designed by Betty Willis at the request of a local salesman who sold it to Clark County.
 Oran K. Gragson becomes mayor.
 Las Vegas Convention Center opens in Winchester.

1960s–1990s
 1960 
 The population of Las Vegas has grown to 64,405, which represents more than 22 percent of Nevada's total population, even though with just 25 square miles it occupies less than 0.02 percent of the state's land.

 1964
 Bonanza Air Lines Flight 114, flying from Phoenix, Arizona to McCarran International Airport, crashes on a hill just southwest of Las Vegas during a landing approach in poor weather conditions. All 26 passengers and 3 crew members were killed when the plane exploded on impact.
 1966 
 Aladdin casino in business.
 Caesars Palacecasino in business on the Strip
 1967
 Las Vegas Marathon begins.
 Barrick Museum of Natural History established.
 Nevada's first independent station, KVVU-TV, signs on in nearby Henderson.
 1968
 Circus Circus in business on the Strip.
 KLVX, Nevada's first ETV station, signs on.
 1970
 Population: 125,787.
 1973 
 Las Vegas City Hall built.
 1979
 Liberace Museum opens near city.
 Faith Lutheran Middle School & High School opens.
 1980
 November 21: In nearby Paradise, the MGM Grand fire occurs.
 Population: 164,674; metro 463,087.
 1981
 Cinedome movie theatre in business.
 KUNV college radio begins broadcasting.
 February 10: In nearby Winchester, a fire occurs at Las Vegas Hilton hotel.
 1982 
 Nevada State Museum, Las Vegas established.
 1983
 Harry Reid becomes U.S. representative for Nevada's 1st congressional district.
 1984
 Spanish Trail Country Club opens.
 Meadows School established.
 1985
 Paradise 6 cinema in business.
 1989
 Mirage casino in business on the Strip.

 1990

 Guinness World Records Museum established.
 Population: 258,295; metro 741,459.
 Excalibur casino in business on the Strip.
 1992 
 Cannon Aviation Museum established near city.
 1993
 MGM Grand, Treasure Island, and Luxor casinos in business on the Strip.
 Las Vegas Business Press begins publication.
 Defcon hacker convention begins.
 1994 
 Zen Center founded.
 1995

 Hard Rock Hotel and Casino in business
 1996
 September: Murder of Tupac Shakur.
 Neon Museum founded.
 Las Vegas CityLife newspaper begins publication.
 Stratosphere and Monte Carlo casinos in business on the Strip.
 1997
 City website online (approximate date).
 New York-New York Hotel & Casino in business on the Strip.

 1998
 Bellagio (hotel and casino) in business on the Strip.
 Las Vegas Weekly newspaper begins publication.
 Las Vegas Philharmonic Orchestra founded.
 1999
 Mandalay Bay, Venetian, and Paris casinos in business on the Strip.
 Oscar Goodman becomes mayor.
 A flood strikes on July 8, killing two people, damaging 353 homes, and causing $20 million in public property damage.
 2000
 Population: 478,434.
 Aladdin Casino rebuilt on the Strip.

21st century 

 2001
 Omar Haikal Islamic Academy opens.
 Palms Casino in business near the Strip.

 2004
 Las Vegas Urban League established.
 2005
 World Market Center built.
 Wynn casino in business on the Strip.
 2006 
 Miss Exotic World Pageant and Burlesque Hall of Fame relocated to Las Vegas.
 2007

 Palazzo casino in business on the Strip.
 2008 
 Encore casino in business on the Strip.

 2009 
 CityCenter opens. The City Center includes: Aria Resort and Casino, Vdara, Mandarin Oriental, Las Vegas, and The Shops at Crystals.
 2010
 Syn Shop hackerspace opens.
 Population: 583,756; metro 1,951,269.
 Cosmopolitan casino in business on the Strip.
 2011
 Sahara Hotel closes for business.
 Carolyn Goodman becomes mayor.
 Population: 589,317; metro 1,969,975.

 
 2012
The Mob Museum opens.
 Smith Center for the Performing Arts opens.
 Las Vegas City Hall rebuilt.
 2013
 Sahara Hotel reopens as SLS Las Vegas.
 Zappos.com headquartered in city.
 Steven Horsford becomes U.S. representative for Nevada's 4th congressional district.
 2014
 8 June: 2014 Las Vegas shootings occur.
 Downtown Summerlin opens. Downtown Project continues expanding the Fremont East district.
 2015 
 May 2: Mayweather-Pacquiao boxing match takes place.
 Riviera Hotel and Casino closes for business.
2016
 T-Mobile Arena opens.
 Plans announced to spend $450 Million on a remodel of Monte Carlo Resort and Casino and rename to Park MGM. In addition to add the NoMad Las Vegas Hotel within the resort on upper floors.
 Riviera Hotel and Casino imploded.
 2017 
 Celebrity Chumlee grand opening, a candy store from an icon at Pawn Stars Pawn Plaza.

 June 20: A heat wave grounded more than 40 airline flights of small aircraft, with American Airlines reducing sales on certain flights to prevent the vehicles from being over the maximum weight permitted for safe takeoff and Las Vegas tying its record high at 117 degrees Fahrenheit.
 October 1: A mass shooting left 60 dead and 867 injured when a 64-year-old man, Stephen Paddock, fired from the 32nd floor of the Mandalay Bay casino and hotel into the Route 91 Harvest country music festival. Paddock subsequently committed suicide.
 October 9: The Vegas Golden Knights of the National Hockey League, Nevada's first major professional sports team, plays its first home game at T-Mobile Arena, defeating the Arizona Coyotes 5–2.
 2018
 Park MGM opened in April.
 NoMad Hotel scheduled to open in Fall.
 Waldorf Astoria Las Vegas replaces Mandarin Oriental Hotel in September.
 2019
 SLS renamed Sahara.
 Alpine Motel Apartments fire occurs in downtown Las Vegas, killing six people in the deadliest fire to occur within city limits.
 2020
 Hard Rock Hotel and Casino closes for business.
 COVID 19 arrives at the city, impacting the economy
 The Oakland Raiders of the National Football League relocates to Las Vegas and becomes the Las Vegas Raiders.
 Circa Resort & Casino opens as the first new downtown resort in 40 years.
 2021
 Hard Rock Hotel reopens as Virgin Hotels Las Vegas.
 Resorts World Las Vegas opens on the former site of the Stardust.

See also

 History of Las Vegas
 List of mayors of Las Vegas
 Timeline of Reno, Nevada

References

Bibliography

 
  
 
 
  (fulltext via OpenLibrary)
  (fulltext via Open Library)
  (series of articles)

External links

 
  (includes Vegas)
 
 Digital Public Library of America. Items related to Las Vegas, various dates

 
Timeline
Las Vegas
Years in Nevada